Vittorio Rieti (January 28, 1898 – February 19, 1994) was a Jewish-Italian-American composer. Born in Alexandria, Egypt, Rieti moved to Milan to study economics. He subsequently studied in Rome under Respighi and Casella, and lived there until 1940.

In 1925, he temporarily moved to Paris and composed music for George Balanchine's ballet for Diaghilev's Ballets Russes, Barabau. He met his wife in Alexandria, Egypt. He was a cousin of actor Vittorio Rietti.

He emigrated to the United States in 1940, becoming a naturalized American citizen on 1 June 1944. He taught at the Peabody Conservatory of Music in Baltimore (1948–49), Chicago Musical College (1950–54), Queens College, New York (1958–60), and New York College of Music (1960–64). He died in New York on 19 February 1994.

His music is tonal and neo-classical with a melodic and elegant style.

Selected works
Ballet
 Barabau (1925)
 Le bal (1929)
 La Sonnambula (1946)

Orchestral
 Symphony No. 3 (1932)
 Symphony No. 4 (1942)
 Suite "La Fontaine" (1968)

Concertante
 Piano Concerto No. 3 (1955)
 Concerto for harpsichord and orchestra (1952–1955, 1972)
 Cello Concerto No. 2 (1953)
 Triple Concerto for violin, viola, piano and orchestra (1971)

Chamber music
 Capriccio for violin and piano (1941)
 Partita for harpsichord, flute, oboe, 2 violins, viola and cello (1945)
 String Quartet No. 3 (1951)
 Woodwind Quintet (1957)
 String Quartet No. 4 (1960)
 Concertino for 5 Instruments for flute, viola, cello, harp and harpsichord (1963)
 Pastorale e fughetta for flute, viola and piano (or harpsichord) (1966)
 Sonata à 5 for flute, oboe, clarinet, bassoon and piano (1966)
 Incisioni for brass quintet (1967)
 Silografie for flute, oboe, clarinet, horn and basson (1967)
 Sestetto pro Gemini for flute, oboe, piano, violin, viola and cello (1975)

Keyboard
 Second Avenue Waltzes for 2 pianos (1942)
 Sonata all' Antica for harpsichord (1946)
 Suite champêtre for 2 pianos (1948)
 Medieval Variations (1962)
 Chorale, variazioni e finale for 2 pianos (1969)

Film music
 Your Money or Your Life, directed by Carlo Ludovico Bragaglia (1933)
 Ritorno alla terra, directed by Mario Franchini (1934)
 Amore, directed by Carlo Ludovico Bragaglia (1935)
 The Happy Road (La route heureuse), directed by Georges Lacombe (1936)
 The Cuckoo Clock, directed by Camillo Mastrocinque (1938)

Notes

External links
Interview with Vittorio Rieti, November 10, 1985

1898 births
1994 deaths
Italian ballet composers
Italian classical composers
Italian male classical composers
20th-century Italian Jews
Jewish American classical composers
New York College of Music faculty
People from Alexandria
Italian emigrants to the United States
20th-century classical composers
Peabody Institute faculty
Queens College, City University of New York faculty
20th-century Italian composers
Ballets Russes composers
20th-century American male musicians
20th-century American Jews
Egyptian emigrants to Italy